Emil Larsson (born August 4, 1993) is a Swedish professional ice hockey forward who currently plays for Örebro HK in the Swedish Hockey League (SHL). He made his Elitserien debut playing with Brynäs IF during the 2012–13 Elitserien season.

Larsson's father is retired hockey player Jan Larsson.

References

External links

1993 births
Almtuna IS players
Brynäs IF players
Living people
Luleå HF players
Örebro HK players
Swedish ice hockey forwards